Portilla is a municipality located in the province of Cuenca, Castile-La Mancha, Spain

Portilla is also surname. Notable people with the surname include:

Alex Diaz de la Portilla (born 1964), Cuban-American politician and member of the Republican Party
Álvaro Portilla Suárez (born 1986), Spanish football player
Cristian Portilla (born 1988), Spanish football player
Giuliano Portilla (born 1972), Peruvian retired football player
Jose Portilla (born 1972), Mexican player of American football
Micaela Portilla (1922–2005), Spanish anthropologist
Miguel Diaz de la Portilla (born 1963), Republican member of the Florida Senate
Miguel de Portilla y Esquivel (1660–1732), Spanish writer
Miguel León-Portilla (1926–2019), Mexican anthropologist and historian
Pablo de la Portillà (19th century), soldier and pioneer in California
Pedro de la Portilla (18th century), Criollo rebel in New Spain against the Spanish

See also 
Portillo (disambiguation)